The Trinil H. K. Fauna, or Trinil Haupt Knochenschicht Fauna (Trinil "main fossil-bearing layer" Fauna) is a biostratigraphic faunal assemblage. It is another interpretation of the collection of fossils gathered by Eugène Dubois at Trinil, where he discovered the early hominid fossils of Java Man. It was proposed in the 1980s a group of Dutch paleontologists to reassess the date of the layer in which Java Man was found.

References

Works cited

See also
 Trinil Fauna

1891 archaeological discoveries
East Java
Prehistoric Indonesia